MSY or msy can mean:

 Maximum sustainable yield
 IATA airport code for Louis Armstrong New Orleans International Airport
 Merseyside, county in England, Chapman code
 The Mount School, York, United Kingdom
 Motor sailing yacht, a ship prefix for a yacht that can use a motor for propulsion and also sail
 Mulayam Singh Yadav
 Million Species Years, a measurement of Background extinction rate